Network behavior anomaly detection (NBAD) is a security technique that provides network security threat detection. It is a complementary technology to systems that detect security threats based on packet signatures.

NBAD is the continuous monitoring of a network for unusual events or trends. NBAD is an integral part of network behavior analysis (NBA), which offers security in addition to that provided by traditional anti-threat applications such as firewalls, intrusion detection systems, antivirus software and spyware-detection software.

Description
Most security monitoring systems utilize a signature-based approach to detect threats. They generally monitor packets on the network and look for patterns in the packets which match their database of signatures representing pre-identified known security threats. NBAD-based systems are particularly helpful in detecting security threat vectors in two instances where signature-based systems cannot: (i) new zero-day attacks, and (ii) when the threat traffic is encrypted such as the command and control channel for certain Botnets.

An NBAD program tracks critical network characteristics in real time and generates an alarm if a strange event or trend is detected that could indicate the presence of a threat. Large-scale examples of such characteristics include traffic volume, bandwidth use and protocol use.

NBAD solutions can also monitor the behavior of individual network subscribers. In order for NBAD to be optimally effective, a baseline of normal network or user behavior must be established over a period of time. Once certain parameters have been defined as normal, any departure from one or more of them is flagged as anomalous.

NBAD technology/techniques are applied in a number of network and security monitoring domains including: (i) Log analysis (ii) Packet inspection systems (iii) Flow monitoring systems and (iv) Route analytics.

NBAD has also been described as outlier detection, novelty detection, deviation detection and exception mining.

Popular threat detections within NBAD
Payload Anomaly Detection
Protocol Anomaly: MAC Spoofing
Protocol Anomaly: IP Spoofing
Protocol Anomaly: TCP/UDP Fanout
Protocol Anomaly: IP Fanout
Protocol Anomaly: Duplicate IP
Protocol Anomaly: Duplicate MAC
Virus Detection
Bandwidth Anomaly Detection
Connection Rate Detection

Commercial products
 Palo Alto Networks – Cortex XDR
Darktrace - AI Enterprise Immune System | Antigena Autonomous Response
 Allot Communications – Allot Communications DDoS Protection
 Arbor Networks NSI – Arbor Network Security Intelligence
Cisco – Stealthwatch (formerly Lancope StealthWatch)
 IBM – QRadar (since 2003)
 Enterasys Networks – Enterasys Dragon
 Exinda – Inbuilt (Application Performance Score (APS), Application Performance Metric (APM), SLA, and Adaptive Response)
 ExtraHop Networks - Reveal(x)
 Flowmon Networks – Flowmon ADS
 FlowNBA – NetFlow
 Juniper Networks – STRM
 Fidelis Cybersecurity – Network Security
 Lastline
 McAfee – McAfee Network Threat Behavior Analysis
 HP ProCurve – Network Immunity Manager
 Riverbed Technology – Riverbed Cascade
 Sourcefire – Sourcefire 3D
 Symantec – Symantec Advanced Threat Protection
 GREYCORTEX – Mendel (formerly TrustPort Threat Intelligence)
Vectra AI
 ZOHO Corporation – ManageEngine NetFlow Analyzer's Advanced Security Analytics Module
 Microsoft Corp – Windows Defender ATP and Advanced Threat Analytics
Vehere - PacketWorker Network Detection and Response

See also
 User behavior analytics

References 

Network analyzers
Security technology
Computer security